Veoneer is an American Swedish provider of automotive technology based in Stockholm, Sweden. It is incorporated in Delaware. The company is the result of a spin-off in 2018 of Autoliv's electronics and automated driving divisions. In 2019, Veoneer acquired high-performance brakes maker Nissin Kogyo's 49% stake in the Veoneer-Nissin Joint Venture's US operation. Veoneer's products include radars, lidars, thermal night vision cameras, vision systems and advanced driver assistance and autonomous driving software. Veoneer counts all major global automakers as its customers.

The company also provides night driving assist systems, active safety sensors, mono-and stereo-vision cameras, airbag control units and crash sensors.

In October 2021, Qualcomm and SSW Partners reached an agreement to buy Veoneer for $4.5 billion. As part of the deal, SSW Partners would sell Veoneer's Arriver business to Qualcomm. The acquisition closed in April 2022. In June 2022, Bloomberg News reported that SSW Partners had started to prepare working on divesting the remainder of Veoneer's businesses. In December 2022, it was announced SSW Partners has sold Veoneer's active safety portion to the Aurora-headquartered automotive parts manufacturer, Magna International for $1.52 billion USD.

See also
Self-driving car

References

External links
 

Companies based in Stockholm
Corporate spin-offs
Companies formerly listed on the New York Stock Exchange
American companies established in 2018
2022 mergers and acquisitions
Private equity portfolio companies